Route 327 is a collector road in the Canadian province of Nova Scotia.

It is located in the Cape Breton Regional Municipality and connects Sydney at Trunk 4 with Gabarus.

In Sydney it runs on Alexandra Street.  South of exit 7 on Highway 125 it is known as the Gabarus Highway.

Communities
Gabarus
French Road
Big Ridge South
Big Ridge
Marion Bridge
Caribou Marsh
Dutch Brook
Prime Brook
Membertou
Sydney

See also
List of Nova Scotia provincial highways

References

External links
Map of Nova Scotia

Nova Scotia provincial highways
Roads in the Cape Breton Regional Municipality
Roads in Richmond County, Nova Scotia